Katiuscia Spada (born 16 November 1981) is an Italian sport shooter.

She participated at the 2018 ISSF World Shooting Championships, winning a medal.

References

External links
 

Living people
1981 births
Italian female sport shooters
Skeet shooters
Shooters of Fiamme Oro